Caner Osmanpaşa (born 15 January 1988) is a Turkish footballer who plays as a defender for Sivasspor.

Professional career
Osmanpaşa is a product of the youth academy of Trabzon Çağlayanspor, and began his senior career with Akçaabat Sebatspor. He moved to Orduspor in Orduspor, and followed that with stints at 1461 Trabzon, Trabzonspor and Akhisarspor. On 10 May 2018, he helped  win their first professional trophy, the 2017–18 Turkish Cup.

Honours
Akhisarspor
 Turkish Cup (1): 2017–18

Sivasspor
 Turkish Cup (1): 2021–22

References

External links
 

1988 births
Living people
Sportspeople from Trabzon
Turkish footballers
Trabzonspor footballers
Kayseri Erciyesspor footballers
Akhisarspor footballers
Sivasspor footballers
Süper Lig players
TFF First League players
TFF Second League players
Association football defenders